Whitehouse is a district and civil parish that covers a large new development area on the western flank of Milton Keynes, Buckinghamshire, England. As the first tier of Local Government, its community council is responsible for the people, living and working in this area of Milton Keynes.

It is bounded by Calverton Lane (the Monks Way (H3) alignment) to the north, Watling Street (V4) to the east, Dansteed Way (H4) to the south and, a hedgerow line to the west.

Origins
The (greenfield) land it occupies was previously part of Whitehouse Farm, in Calverton, a rural parish that is now just outside of the Milton Keynes urban area. In 2004, the Government decided on the further expansion of Milton Keynes and accordingly designated land on the eastern and western flanks for this purpose. Along with the adjacent parish of Fairfields (and Broughton on the eastern flank), this is part of the implementation of that decision.

Electoral ward (Borough)
The Parish falls within the Stony Stratford Ward of the City of Milton Keynes.

Schools
There are currently two schools in the parish: Whitehouse Primary School and Watling Academy, a secondary school.

A new primary school, Watling Primary, is due to open in the area in September 2023.

Footnotes

References

External links

Civil parishes in Buckinghamshire